Too Cool to Kill is a 2022 Chinese action comedy film, based on the 2008 Japanese film The Magic Hour. It stars Wei Xiang as an amateur actor who is invited to play a leading role in a film and ends up drawn into a dangerous situation. It was released in China on 1 February 2022 (Chinese New Year) and in the United States and Canada on 18 February 2022. It is Xing Wenxiong's feature film directorial debut.

Plot

Wannabe actor Wei Chenggong is invited by actress Milan to star in a film playing the role of hit man "Killer Carl". When he accepts the invitation, he finds himself drawn into a dangerous conspiracy.

Cast
 Wei Xiang (魏翔) as Wei Chenggong
 Ma Li (马丽) as Mi Lan
 Chen Minghao (陈明昊) as Harvey
 Zhou Dayong (周大勇) as Jimmy
 Huang Cailun (黄才伦) as Mi Le
  (艾伦) as Karl

Production

Too Cool to Kill is an adaptation of Kōki Mitani's 2008 Japanese film The Magic Hour.

It was written and directed by Xing Wenxiong (邢文雄), one of the writers of My People, My Homeland. It is Xing's feature film directorial debut. It was produced by Yan Fei (闫非) and Peng Damo (彭大魔). Filming began on 23 June 2021, and on the same day it was announced that the film would be released on Chinese New Year 2022.

For one scene in the film, Wei Xiang had to speak Italian, a language which he had never studied and felt stressed about speaking, according to costar Zhou Dayong. Wei said in an interview that the crew gave him a translator, who spoke to him after shooting and helped him memorize the lines.

Release

The film was released in China on 1 February 2022 (Chinese New Year), and it was released in a limited number of cities in the United States and Canada on 18 February 2022 by distributor Well Go USA. It was the only pure comedy scheduled for release on Chinese New Year 2022.

Reception
The film has been one of the most successful of the 2022 Chinese New Year releases. The film grossed $217 million in its first six days, including $110.5 million in its opening weekend. It received positive reviews from advance screening audiences, and on the day of its release, it got an average rating of 9.2 on Maoyan.

References

External links
 
 
 
 

2022 films
Chinese comedy films
2022 comedy films
Films about actors
Chinese remakes of foreign films
Chinese action comedy films
Chinese New Year films